Cyberwar is a DOS game based on the film The Lawnmower Man and a direct sequel to the video game adaptation of the film, which itself takes place after the film. It was released in 1994 by SCi. Ports were announced for the Sega CD, 3DO Interactive Multiplayer, and in Japan only for the Sega Saturn and Sony PlayStation, but only the Japan-only PlayStation version was released.

Gameplay
The player assumes the role of Dr. Angelo, sent in to virtual reality to defeat Jobe, who was born with an intellectual disability but increased his brain capacity by 400% using virtual reality, then eventually left his physical body and entered VR permanently. The various gameplay elements are based on the virtual reality segments seen in the original film. For instance, one of the levels has the player flying through tunnels while avoiding multiple objects, much like one of the games in the film.

If the player misses any part of any challenge, they reach a game over. Cyberwar consists of three discs but also includes a CD with the soundtrack featured in the game.

Reception
A reviewer for Next Generation gave the PC version two out of five stars, calling it a rehash of SCI's original title The Lawnmower Man with slightly changed action sequences and the 256-color graphics.

On release, Famicom Tsūshin scored the PlayStation version of the game an 18 out of 40. Reviewing it as an import, Next Generation gave it two out of five stars, razing it for its extremely limited interactivity.

References

External links 
 SCi Website
SCi Games Ltd. Profile on MobyGames

1994 video games
Cancelled 3DO Interactive Multiplayer games
Cancelled Sega CD games
Cancelled Sega Saturn games
DOS games
Full motion video based games
Classic Mac OS games
PlayStation (console) games
Science fiction video games
Video games based on films
Video games developed in the United Kingdom
Video games about virtual reality
Video games about video games
Single-player video games
Video game sequels
Interplay Entertainment games